Hockey Cirque is a glacial cirque  wide along the east wall of Ascent Glacier in the Miller Range of Antarctica. It was so named by the Ohio State University Geological Party, 1967–68, because the cirque was the scene of a game of ice hockey.

References

Cirques of Antarctica
Landforms of Oates Land